Paroxygraphis is a genus of flowering plants belonging to the family Ranunculaceae.

Its native range is Himalaya.

Species:
 Paroxygraphis sikkimensis W.W.Sm.

References

Ranunculaceae
Ranunculaceae genera